Kevin Rockett is an Irish film historian, writer and scholar, specialising on the history of Irish cinema. He is currently Associate Professor in Film Studies and head of the School of Drama, Film and Music, at Trinity College, Dublin, and is author, co-author, or editor of numerous books, including Cinema and Ireland (1987), The Irish Filmography (1996), Neil Jordan: Exploring Boundaries (2003) and Irish Film Censorship (2004).

Background
Rockett became a member of the Irish Film Institute in 1979, and was its chairman from 1984 through 1991. He received his doctorate from the University of Ulster in 1989. He taught film studies at University College Dublin before joining the faculty at Trinity College in 2000.  He was made a Fellow of the College in 2004, receiving his Master in Arts (jure officii), and currently serves as head of Trinity College's school of drama, film and music.

In 1995 Rockett wrote the screenplay for the film Irish Cinema: Ourselves Alone?, directed by Donald Taylor Black.

Partial bibliography
1987, Cinema and Ireland. Kevin Rockett, Luke Gibbons, John Hill. 
1995, Still Irish: A Century of the Irish in Film. Kevin Rockett, Eugene Finn. 
1996, The companion to British and Irish cinema. John Caughie, Kevin Rockett. 
1996, Cinema companions pack. John Caughie, Kevin Rockett. 
1996, The Irish Filmography: Fiction Films 1896–1996. Kevin Rockett. 
1999, Still Irish: A Century of the Irish in Film. 
2002, Neil Jordan. Kevin Rockett. 
2003, Ten years after: the Irish film board 1993–2003. Kevin Rockett, Bord Scannán na hÉireann. 
2003, Neil Jordan: exploring boundaries. Emer Rockett, Kevin Rockett. 
2004, Irish film censorship: a cultural journey from silent cinema to internet pornography. Kevin Rockett, Emer Rockett. 
2004, National cinema and beyond. Kevin Rockett, John Hill. 
2005, Film history and national cinema. W. John Hill, Kevin Rockett. 
2007, Irish films, global cinema. Martin McLoone, Kevin Rockett. 
2008, National cinemas and world cinema. Kevin Rockett, W. John Hill.

Recognition
The Irish Times wrote in 1996 of Rockett's early work Cinema and Ireland (1987), offering that it "remains the Bible of Irish film studies."
Filmmaker Bob Quinn wrote of Irish Filmography: Fiction Films 1896 – 1996 (1996), stating [the book is] "an extraordinary opus ... Rockett is an excellent and painstaking scholar. Never before has anybody attempted to document in one volume every film ever made in or about Ireland. ... The amount of detail he has unearthed is no less than stupendous. ... The nearest literary analogy I can think of is Dineen's Irish Dictionary", Jeff Brownrigg of Australia's National Film and Sound Archive wrote that the book is "an indispensable tool for the researcher." and that it "provides a valuable source of information about a large group of international narrative feature films gathered together under the head of their general association with Ireland."  He comments on the book's nearly two thousand entries and makes note of its comprehensive nature, concluding that it "is clearly an essential reference for libraries and will be sought by film buffs."

Lir Mac Cárthaigh of Film Ireland wrote that Neil Jordan: exploring boundaries (2003) "provides a convenient starting-point for anyone intending to write about Jordan's work, the history of Irish film, or cinematic representations."

John Kelleher, former Director of the Irish Film Classification Office, referred to Rockett's book Irish Film Censorship (2004) as the key text on the subject. It was described as "magisterial," (Hugh Linehan, Irish Times) "monumental," (RTÉ Radio 1) "meticulous," (Luke Gibbons, Irish Times) and "fascinating" (Kim Bielenberg, Irish Independent).

In 2001 Rockett received the Irish Film Institute Award for Contribution to Irish Film.

References

Irish writers
Irish educators
20th-century Irish historians
21st-century Irish historians
Film historians
Living people
Year of birth missing (living people)